The Speaker of the National Assembly of Hungary (literally the President of National Assembly of Hungary) is the presiding officer of the National Assembly of Hungary. The current Speaker is László Kövér, since 6 August 2010.

The Speaker of the National Assembly serves as acting President of Hungary if the elected president vacates the office before the expiration of the 5-year presidential term due to death, resignation or removal from office.

Speakers of the National Assembly of Hungary
Parties

In 1927 the National Assembly of Hungary became bicameral.

Speakers of the Provisional National Assembly
Parties

Speakers of the National Assembly of Hungary
Parties

Hungary (since 1989)
Parties

See also
 List of speakers of the House of Magnates
 List of speakers of the House of Representatives (Hungary)

References

Sources
  Official website of the National Assembly of Hungary 

 
Hungary, National Assembly